Hamza Boulemdaïs (born 22 November 1982 in Constantine) is an Algerian football player who is currently playing for CS Constantine in the Algerian Ligue Professionnelle 1.

Club career
On 6 July 2011 Boulemdaïs announced that he would be joining JS Kabylie at the end of the season.

References

External links
 
 

1982 births
Living people
Footballers from Constantine, Algeria
Algerian footballers
Algerian Ligue Professionnelle 1 players
MC El Eulma players
MSP Batna players
JSM Béjaïa players
JS Kabylie players
CS Constantine players
Algeria international footballers
Association football forwards
21st-century Algerian people